Highway 31 is a highway in the Canadian province of Saskatchewan. It runs from Highway 14 in Macklin to Highway 4 north of Rosetown.

Major intersections
From west to east:

References

031